Thomas W. Harvey High School is a public high school in Painesville, Ohio, United States.  It is the only high school in the Painesville City Local School District.

Former building
Harvey High School's previous building was located at 167 West Washington Street, on the site of the former Painesville Academy. Dedicated in 1922, it was demolished in 2010, the year after the current school opened on the site of Hobart Middle School.

Notable alumni
 Joe Dolce, singer-songwriter, poet and essayist.
Don Shula, former coach of the Miami Dolphins.
Danny Nardico, former professional boxer and wrestler.

References

External links

High schools in Lake County, Ohio
Public high schools in Ohio
2009 establishments in Ohio